Details is the sole studio album by British electronic duo Frou Frou. It was released on June 4, 2002 by MCA Records in the United States and by Island Records internationally.

Commercial performance
As of 2009, songs "Let Go" has sold 370,000 units in the US while the album has sold 284,000 copies in the US and 29,000 copies in the UK.

Reception

Play reviewed Details positively, calling the duo "refreshing" and "not the typical electronic dance-music factory drones" and writing, "This melodic, occasionally striking collection of new-wave dance songs doesn't reek of overproduction, benefiting greatly from the pleasing, softening array of live instruments." For AllMusic, Alex Henderson gave the album three out of five stars, opining that the album had "quality singing and composing" which made it "a cut above much of the electronic Europop that came out in 2002" and comparing it to the music of singers Björk, Kate Bush, and Dido. Andy Thomas of Drowned in Sound called the album "mature", also comparing it to Dido and writing, "They do have more than a handful of good, if not overly ambitious, tunes."

Zach Braff's use of the song "Let Go" for the ending credits for his film Garden State (2004) and the inclusion on its Grammy-winning soundtrack is credited as exposing Frou Frou and Imogen Heap to a much wider audience. Its use as the last song was actually suggested by Braff's girlfriend at the time, Bonnie Somerville.

Writing for Entertainment Weekly, Ariana Bacle named "Let Go" as the third-best song from the Garden State soundtrack, describing it as "a could-be dance track but with more drama, more heart, and just enough Imogen Heap". On Stereogums Margaret Farrell's list of the ten best Imogen Heap songs, "Hear Me Out" and "Let Go" were ranked fifth and third, respectively. Farrell described "Let Go" as "a cataclysmic escape" and "a song that bubbles with wonder and excitement bordering on anxiety", also identifying it as "probably Frou Frou's most popular song".

Track listing

Samples
 "Hear Me Out" contains a sample from "An Ending (Ascent)" by Brian Eno.

Singles
Select any single to see the track listings of all released versions.

Personnel
Credits adapted from Tidal.

Imogen Heapvocals, production, mixing (tracks 7, 11)
Guy Sigsworthproduction, keyboards (track 2), mixing (tracks 7, 11)
Mich Gerberdouble bass (tracks 1, 5)
Ioana Petcu-Colanviolin (tracks 1, 5)
Alasdair Malloypercussion (tracks 3, 5, 7)
Elad Elhararbass guitar (track 3)
Makoto Sakamotodrums (tracks 4, 6)
Jon Hasselltrumpet (tracks 1011)
Tom Coynemastering
Gili Wiseburghmixing (tracks 12, 46, 810), engineering (tracks 110), recording arrangement (tracks 110), additional mixing (tracks 3, 7)
Tom Elmhurstmixing (track 3), additional mixing (track 1)
Damian Taylormixing (track 2), additional mixing (track 11)
Sean McGheeengineering (track 4)
Gert Staeublerecording arrangement (track 5)
Pete Scaturrorecording arrangement (track 10), recording engineering (track 11)

References

2002 debut albums
Albums produced by Guy Sigsworth
MCA Records albums
Island Records albums
Frou Frou (band) albums